Robert 'Bob' Farmer (born 2 June 1947) is a former Australian rules footballer who played for Collingwood in the Victorian Football League (VFL) during the 1960s.

A centre half forward, Farmer was aged just 16 years and 363 days when he made his senior VFL debut in 1964. He struggled to establish a place in the Collingwood team which made the finals in five of the six seasons that he was at the club, although he had a good season in 1968, kicking 22 goals and was chosen to represent Australia in the 'Galahs' World Tour that year.

The only final Farmer played was his final league game for Collingwood; the 1969 Preliminary Final loss to Richmond at the Melbourne Cricket Ground, where he kicked two goals. Farmer then accepted a lucrative offer from South Australian National Football League (SANFL) club West Adelaide, which included "a fully furnished flat, a good position with a cigarette company and a weekly match payment 'too good to refuse'".

References

Holmesby, Russell and Main, Jim (2007). The Encyclopedia of AFL Footballers. 7th ed. Melbourne: Bas Publishing.

1947 births
Living people
Collingwood Football Club players
West Adelaide Football Club players
Australian rules footballers from Victoria (Australia)